Three Monkeys is a 2008 Turkish film directed by Nuri Bilge Ceylan. The film was Turkey's official submission for the Academy Award for Best Foreign Language Film at the 81st Academy Awards, and it made the January short-list but was not nominated.

Plot
A family is dislocated when small failings become extravagant lies. The film opens as a wealthy businessman, Servet, running a campaign for the upcoming election, is driving in his car alone and sleepy, struggling to keep his eyes open. Seconds later he hits and kills a pedestrian in the middle of the road. Servet panics when another car with a couple inside approaches. He sneaks away.

Eyüp, a man living in a slum at the Yedikule neighborhood in İstanbul, with his wife and only son, is the driver of Servet. He wakes up in the middle of the night with his cell phone ringing. It's his boss, telling Eyüp to meet him immediately. Shivering in shock, Servet explains the current events to his driver. His excuse is if the fatal accident comes out in press it would terminate his political career, so he proposes Eyüp to take over the penalty and stay in prison for a brief period of time in exchange for a lump sum payment upon his release, whilst still paying his salary to his family so they can get by. Eyüp accepts the deal.

An unspecified time passes, summer arrives, and Eyüp's son İsmail fails to enter college again. His mother, Hacer, who works in the catering division of a factory, starts worrying about her son after unpleasant events, and tries to convince him to get a job. İsmail suggests driving children between home and school but of course they don't have any financial source for this kind of an enterprise. İsmail asks his mother to request an advance payment from Servet without consulting Eyüp. Hacer meets with Servet, in his office after the election (which he lost), and requests the money. After Hacer leaves the office and starts waiting for a bus at the stop Servet persuades Hacer to accept a lift from him back to her home.

More unspecified time passes, and İsmail intends to visit his father. Things take a poor turn when he finds his mother having an affair with Servet. İsmail stands passive. After serving nine months in prison, Eyüp is released. He senses things are "a little peculiar" inside his home. Hacer is in love with Servet and insists on maintaining their affair. Servet disagrees. That night, Hacer and Eyüp are invited to the police station and informed that Servet has been murdered. Police officers interrogate the two and Eyüp finds out that Hacer was cheating on him. He denies knowing anything about it.  İsmail confesses to his mother that he murdered Servet. Eyüp calms down when he pays a visit to a mosque. Afterwards, Eyüp goes on to speak with a very poor man who works and sleeps inside a tea house in the neighborhood. Eyüp makes the same proposition to the poor man, Bayram, that Servet made to him: to claim the crime committed by his son.

Cast
Yavuz Bingöl as Eyüp
Hatice Aslan as Hacer
Ahmet Rıfat Şungar as İsmail
Ercan Kesal as Servet
Cafer Köse as Bayram
Gürkan Aydın as the child

Reception
Three Monkeys has received positive reviews from critics. On Rotten Tomatoes, the film has a "certified fresh" rating of 78%, based on 58 reviews, with an average rating of 6.8/10. The site's critical consensus reads, "Exploring the effects of a family's dealings with an underhanded politician, this crime drama avoids showing the violent outcomes of its characters' misdeeds, resulting in a lingeringly potent film." On Metacritic, the film has a score of 73 out of 100, based on 14 critics, indicating "generally favorable reviews".

Accolades
The film premiered in competition at the 2008 Cannes Film Festival on May 16, where Ceylan won, ten days later, the Award for Best Director. It also won the Golden Anchor Competition Award at the Haifa International Film Festival. The film won best special effects award at the Golden Orange Film Festival, as well as the Siyad award at the International Eurasia Film Festival. At the Osian's Cinefan Film Festival the film won the Best Director Award, and at the "Manaki Brothers" Film Camera Festival it won Mosfilm Award and Special Mention. Ceylan received the award for Achievement in Directing at the Asia Pacific Screen Awards, where the film also received nominations for Best Feature Film and Achievement in Cinematography.

Awards and Festivals
 2008 Cannes Film Festival
Candidacy for Golden Palm in 61. Cannes Film Festival
Cannes Best Director Award -Won-
 Oscar Awards
Last 9 for Best Foreign Language Film in 81st Academy Awards
  Other Awards
2. Yeşilçam Awards 
 Best Movie -won-
 Best Director -won-
 Best Scenario -won-
 Best Actress -won-
 Best Actor
 Best Supporting Actor
 Best Director of Photography -won-
 Young Talent Special Award -won-
41. Siyad Awards
 Best Art Direction
 Best Fiction -won-
 Best Image Management
 Best Scenario
 Best Actor Performance
 Best Actress Performance -won-
 Best Supporting Actor -won- 
 Best Director -won-
 Best Film
Osian's Cinefan Film Festival
 Best Director -won-
Haifa Film Festival
 Best Film (Golden Anchos) -won-
Asia Pasific Screen Awards
 Best Director -won- 
 Best Film 
 Best Image
"Manaki Brothers" Film Camera Festival 
 Mosfilm Awards -won-
 Special Mention -won-

Related links

Three wise monkeys
Nuri Bilge Ceylan

References

External links
 Official Site
 Three Monkeys (Zeitgeist Films)
 
 
 Three Monkeys: A film review 

2008 films
Films directed by Nuri Bilge Ceylan
Films set in Istanbul
Films set in Turkey
2000s Turkish-language films
Turkish drama films